The Wiltshire County Cricket League (WCCL) is the feeder cricket league for the Wiltshire section of the West of England Premier League (WEPL). , the league has nine divisions of ten teams, who play 45-over matches on Saturdays. The winner of Division One is promoted into the WEPL.

The league was formed in the early 1980s and covers most of Wiltshire and Swindon (except for the Salisbury area, where teams play in Hampshire leagues), as well as including clubs which are just over the border into Somerset, Gloucestershire and Oxfordshire. Clubs may field more than one team.

Beginning with the 2020 season, the league is sponsored by Neon Cricket, a Trowbridge-based supplier of cricket equipment.

The league is a member of Wiltshire Cricket Limited, the governing body for cricket in the county.

Division 1 winners

External links
 
 Spye Park Cricket Club
 Devizes Cricket Club
 Calne Cricket Club
 Malmesbury Cricket Club
 Marshfield Cricket Club

References 

English domestic cricket competitions
Cricket in Wiltshire